Sylvano Simone (born 10 October 1963) is an Italian-American tennis coach and former professional player.

Simone played collegiate tennis for the University of Arkansas.

Active on tour in the 1990s, Simone made his only ATP Tour main draw appearance with Mikael Stadling in doubles at the 1993 Kuala Lumpur Open, where they were beaten in the first round by Michael Chang and his brother Carl.

References

External links
 
 

1963 births
Living people
Italian male tennis players
American people of Italian descent
Arkansas Razorbacks men's tennis players